Reason Branch is a  long 1st order tributary to the Rocky River in Union County, North Carolina.  This is the only stream of this name in the United States.

Course
Reason Branch rises in a pond about 1 mile west of New Salem, North Carolina and then flows northeast to join the Rocky River about 3 miles north-northwest of New Salem.

Watershed
Reason Branch drains  of area, receives about 48.0 in/year of precipitation, has a wetness index of 393.52, and is about 43% forested.

References

Rivers of North Carolina
Rivers of Union County, North Carolina